Chilarchaea is a monotypic genus of spiders in the Mecysmaucheniidae family. It was first described by Forster & Platnick in 1984. , it contains only one species, Chilarchaea quellon, found in Chile and Argentina.

References

Mecysmaucheniidae
Monotypic Araneomorphae genera
Spiders of South America